The siege of Faenza occurred from August 1240 to April 14, 1241, during the course of the wars of the Guelphs and the Ghibellines. In this military confrontation, the Holy Roman Emperor Frederick II aggressively laid siege to the town of Faenza and successfully captured the city.

Background
In August 1237, Frederick II returned to the northern Italian domain of the Holy Roman Empire from northern Europe. He had just put his affairs in Germany and Austria in order, including electing his son Conrad as the King of Germany and vanquishing the rebellious Duke of Austria. With these accomplishments complete, the Emperor assembled an army and turned his attention to reasserting control over the rebellious northern Italian cities in his Empire.

The war for Lombardy and Italy
Once he reached northern Italy in the late summer of 1237, Frederick II and his Ghibelline allies quickly captured the cities of Mantua and Ferrara. Then on November 27, 1237, the Imperial army decisively defeated the Lombard League at Cortenuova.

In August 1238, Frederick II attempted to capture the city of Brescia by means of a siege; this effort failed and in October an armistice was put in place.

Pope Gregory IX takes action
These actions of Frederick II and the possibility that the Holy Roman Empire would dominate all of Italy soon became threatening to Pope Gregory IX. In defense, Gregory IX went on the attack against Frederick II in the early months of 1239. First the Pope formed an alliance with the republics of Venice and Genoa and asserted his support of the Lombard League. Then in March 1239 Gregory IX excommunicated Frederick II for ten crimes including inciting "rebellion in Rome against the Pope and Cardinals" and being in "contempt of the papal decision between himself and the Lombards." In addition, Gregory IX proclaimed a Crusade against the Emperor and raised a large Guelph army to fight against the enemies of the Pope. And finally, the Pope declared that excommunication included for Frederick II a forfeiture of his Empire, and instructed the German princes to move forward with an election.

War between Frederick II and Pope Gregory IX
The result was an extended and prolonged war between the Holy Roman Empire and Pope Gregory IX. Fighting began in 1239 when Frederick II named his son Enzio his Vicar or Lieutenant in Italy. Enzio won victories in north at Romagna and in central Italy at the Marche of Ancona. The Guelphs defeated the Ghibellines at Ravenna but the Ghibelline defeated the Bolognese. Frederick II considered a siege on Milan but changed his mind and led his army into Tuscany,where he spent Christmas in Pisa.

In 1240 Frederick II advanced south. He captured the cities of Lucca, Siena, and Arezzo. Frederick II continued south into Papal territory and captured the city of Foligno. The citizens of Foligno and Viterbo declared their loyalty to the Holy Roman Emperor. For a while the citizens of Rome leaned toward Frederick II, but Gregory IX won back their loyalty. Rather than attack Rome, Frederick II took his army to southern Italy to address a papal incited rebellion in Apulia. In southern Italy Frederick II attacked and razed Benevento and St. Angelo.

Meanwhile, in northern Italy, Ferrara surrendered to Venice. The Guelphs unsuccessfully attacked Padua but captured Mantua.

In the south, Frederick II raises a new Apulian Army and moves where the city of Ravenna surrendered on 8 August 1240. Next Frederick II set his sights on Faenza, a city that had previously expelled its Ghibellines and were now the home of 36,000 Guelphs.

The siege of Faenza

When the siege of Faenza began in August 1240, the citizens of Faenza were at first encouraged when they saw that Frederick II did not have hard currency to pay his soldiers and resorted to "coins" struck from leather. However, the citizens were soon discouraged when they saw that Frederick II's intrinsically worthless leather "coins" were readily accepted upon his word by his army. Frederick II attempted to negotiate a surrender however the Faenzans were told by Gregory IX's emissaries that help from the Milanese and the Bolognese would be forthcoming.

No help ever came from the Milanese or the Bolognese. The Venetians attempted to draw Frederick II's forces away from Faenza by raiding the Apulian coast, but Frederick II kept his soldiers in camp and let the Apulians defend Apulia. Faenza's last hope was that the winter would force Frederick II to retreat. Here again Frederick II held fast, ordering his army to build huts that would withstand inclement weather. When food supplies ran short in the besieged city, the citizens sought permission to send out their women, children, and non-combatants. This request was denied by Frederick II as he knew that such an act would only prolong the siege of those fighting men that remained inside the city walls.

Ultimately, the citizens offered to surrender if they would be allowed to leave the town with their safety protected. Here again Frederick II refused to make any promises because of past offenses against him including an assassination attempt. Finally the citizens surrendered unconditionally on 14 April 1241 when famine and the condition of the city walls gave them little choice. As the defenders of Faenza exited the city expecting death sentences, Frederick II pronounced their unconditional pardon.

Final outcome
In 1241 the war continued to go badly for the Pope. Gregory IX decided to yield; he moved to begin negotiations for a truce and peace treaty. When the talks went nowhere, the Pope stopped the peace negotiations and called for a General Council. Frederick II prevented the delegates of the General Council from assembling by intercepting the prelates at sea at the Battle of Giglio.

Frederick II advanced on Rome, but on 22 August 1241 Gregory IX died. Frederick II called off the attack on Rome, saying that he was not at war with the church. Frederick II went to Sicily while a new Pope was elected.

Citations

References

Further reading

Faenza
Faenza
1240s in the Holy Roman Empire
1240 in Europe
Faenza
Faenza
13th century in Italy
Faenza
Frederick II, Holy Roman Emperor